Mount Tamalpais Cemetery is located in San Rafael, California.

History 
The cemetery was founded by Dr. Henry A. Dubois, Jr. An ordinance was passed that prohibited any burials within the towns limits. Dr DuBois attended a town hall meeting where he among many others offered bids to start up a new cemetery. DuBois' bid of $13,000 for a part of his ranch was the ultimate winner. He toured over 40 cemeteries and drew up plans before the cemetery was being built so he could figure out the best possible layout for the cemetery. After hiring around 40 men, most of who were Chinese Laborers, the cemetery was finally completed in August 1879.

Notable interments 

 Bessie Barriscale (1884–1965), actress
 Maurice Carey Blake (1815–1897), Mayor of San Francisco
 Robert Dollar (1844–1932), businessman
 Henry Augustus DuBois (1840–1897), surgeon and Mount Tamalpais Cemetery founder
 Seldon Connor Gile (1877–1947), dominant painter in the "Society of Six"
 Jack Finney (1911–1995), author
 Don Flickinger (1907–1997), US Air Force flight surgeon and brigadier general
 Lefty Gomez (1908–1989), Hall of Fame baseball player
 Howard C. Hickman (1880–1949), actor
 Russ Hodges (1910–1971), sportscaster
 Ali Akbar Khan (1922–2009), Indian classical musician
 William S. Mailliard (1917–1992), US Representative

 James B. McNamara (1882–1941), bomber of the Los Angeles Times building in 1910
 Ernie Nevers (1903–1976), professional football and baseball player
 June Pointer (1953–2006), pop singer
 Chet Powers, a.k.a. Dino Valenti and Jesse Oris Farrow (1937–1994), singer-songwriter
 Sally Stanford (1903–1982), civic personality
 Diane Varsi (1938–1992), actress

See also
 List of cemeteries in California

References

External links
 Mount Tamalpais Cemetery
 

Buildings and structures in San Rafael, California
Cemeteries in Marin County, California
1879 establishments in California